Saemaul Sports Hall is an indoor arena located in Seoul, South Korea. Built from June 1984 to June 1986, it hosted the volleyball preliminaries for the 1988 Summer Olympics. At the Asian Games two years earlier, the hall hosted the judo competitions.

References
1988 Summer Olympics official report. Volume 1. Part 1. p. 194.

Venues of the 1988 Summer Olympics
Olympic volleyball venues
Indoor arenas in South Korea
Sports venues in Seoul
Volleyball venues in South Korea
Sports venues completed in 1986
Venues of the 1986 Asian Games
Asian Games judo venues